Schunk Lodge is a log cabin located in a remote section of the Bighorn Mountains. The cabin was used as a mail stage stop and as a dude ranch before it became a mountain cabin for Will Schunk, a conservationist who was instrumental in the establishment of the nearby Cloud Peak Wilderness.

Schunk Lodge was listed on the National Register of Historic Places in on January 4, 2018.

References

National Register of Historic Places in Big Horn County, Wyoming